The Ecology Center is an educational nonprofit located in Orange County, California, that focuses on environmental awareness.

Background
The organization was founded by Evan Marks in 2008 on a two-acre plot that was once an 1898 homestead, the historical Joel Congdon house. It is well known locally for its annual Green Feast event. The Ecology Center's "Water Shed" program involves educating Orange County residents about water conservation, and its "Grow Your Own" program builds gardens for local schools.

References

Environmental organizations based in California
Environmental organizations established in 2008
Education in Orange County, California
Environmental education in the United States
Nature centers in California